James Mann is a Washington-based journalist and author. He has written a series of non-fiction books, including three about America's relationship with China and four more about American foreign policy. His group biography about George W. Bush's war cabinet, Rise of The Vulcans, was a New York Times best-seller. As a newspaper journalist, he worked for more than two decades for the Los Angeles Times, where he served as Supreme Court correspondent, Beijing bureau chief, and foreign-policy columnist. Earlier in his career, he worked at The Washington Post, where he took part in the newspaper's Watergate coverage.

Life
Mann was born and raised in Albany, New York, where both his father Jay D. Mann and his grandfather Abraham Mann were local physicians. His mother, Peggy Lebair Mann, was the coach of women's tennis at the State University of New York at Albany, as well as a longtime tennis umpire who officiated at both the U.S. Open and at Wimbledon. Mann graduated from Harvard University in 1968 with a BA in sociology. During his 33-year newspaper career, he worked for the New Haven Journal-Courier, The Washington Post, The Philadelphia Inquirer, The Baltimore Sun, and the Los Angeles Times. He served as Chief of the Beijing bureau of the Los Angeles Times from 1984 to 1987.

His magazine articles have appeared in The New Republic, The Atlantic Monthly, The American Prospect, and The American Lawyer. His 1992 article, "Who Was Deep Throat?", was included in The Atlantic Monthly's collection, "The American Idea: The Best of The Atlantic Monthly: 150 Years of Writers and Thinkers Who Have Shaped Our History".

Awards
1993; 1999 Edwin M. Hood Award for diplomatic correspondence, by the National Press Club
1997 Goldsmith Prize for Investigative Reporting
1999 Edward Weintal Prize for diplomatic reporting
2005 Berlin Prize
2000 New York Public Library Helen Bernstein book award.
2000 Asia Pacific Book Award (Japan)
2010 Ambassador Book Award of the English-Speaking Union

Works
; reprint Westview Press, 1997, . A case study of how one of the first American companies to enter the China market discovered the realities of how tough it is to do business there. In 2005, Fortune magazine included this book on its list of 75 all-time great books about business.
 About Face: A History of America's Curious Relationship With China From Nixon to Clinton, Alfred Knopf, 1999,  A history of America's often-hidden hidden diplomacy with China. This book won the New York Public Library's Helen Bernstein and the Asia-Pacific Award; it was also short-listed as a finalist for the Lionel Gelber Prize. 
  A New York Times best-seller, this book was one of the finalists for the Arthur Ross book award of the Council on Foreign Relations.
; reprint Penguin Books, 2008, 
 This book won the Ambassador Book Award of the English-Speaking Union.
The Obamians: The Struggle Inside the White House to Redefine American Power. Viking. 2012.
George W. Bush: The American Presidents Series: The 43rd President, 2001-2009. Henry Holt and Company, 2015  
Damage Bigly January 18, 2018 issue of New York Review Books
The Great Rift: Dick Cheney, Colin Powell, and the Broken Friendship That Defined an Era. Henry Holt and Company, 2020.

References

External links 
discusses his book The China Fantasy as part of  the University of Chicago's World Beyond the Headlines Series
"James Mann", Conversations with History: Institute of International Studies, UC Berkeley

Living people
1946 births
Writers from Albany, New York
American political journalists
Harvard University alumni
Journalists from New York (state)